Miss USA 1962 was the 11th Miss USA pageant, held in Miami, Florida, on July 12, 1962. The pageant was won by Macel Leilani Wilson of Hawaii, who was crowned by outgoing titleholder Sharon Brown of Louisiana.  Wilson's win gave Hawaii the Miss USA crown at its first attempt, and two days later she was a Top 15 semi-finalist at Miss Universe 1962.  Eleven states did not send a delegate to the 1962 pageant, resulting in the lowest number of contestants since the inaugural pageant of 1952.  Macel is the first Asian-American to win the title of Miss USA.

Results

Historical significance 
 Hawaii wins competition for the first time. Also becoming in the 10th state who does it for the first time. And also competes as a state for the very first time.
 Connecticut earns the 1st runner-up position for the first time, becoming its highest placement of the state until 2013.
 Tennessee earns the 2nd runner-up position for the first time, becoming its highest placement of the state until 1999.
 California earns the 3rd runner-up position for the second time. The last time it placed this was in 1955.
 Nevada earns the 4th runner-up position for the first time.
 States that placed in semifinals the previous year were California, Connecticut, Nevada, New York and Utah.
 California and New York placed for the sixth consecutive year. 
 Connecticut and Utah placed for the third consecutive year. 
 Nevada made their second consecutive placement.
 Colorado and Texas last placed in 1959.
 Tennessee and Illinois last placed in 1958.
 Oregon last placed in 1956.
 District of Columbia and Indiana last placed in 1954.
 Pennsylvania last placed in 1953.
 Arizona, Hawaii and New Hampshire placed for the first time.
 Massachusetts, Michigan and New Jersey break an ongoing streak of placements since 1960.
 West Virginia breaks an ongoing streak of placements since 1959.
 Alabama and Louisiana break an ongoing streak of placements since 1958.

Delegates
The Miss USA 1962 delegates were:

 Alabama - Jerolyn Ridgeway
 Alaska - Teresa Hanson
 Arizona - Jerri Michaelson
 Arkansas - Linda Riggan
 California - Marilyn Tindall
 Colorado - Penny James
 Connecticut - Diane Zabicki
 District of Columbia - Helen Sweeney
 Florida - Sharon Conrad
 Georgia - Genelda Odum
 Hawaii - Macel Leilani Wilson
 Idaho - Kinne Marie Holland
 Illinois - Jean Donnelly
 Indiana - Sue Ekamp
 Iowa - Regina Prusher
 Kansas - Linda Light
 Kentucky - Sally Carter
 Louisiana - Diane DeClouet
 Maine - Karen Henderson
 Maryland - Shelda Farley
 Massachusetts - Gail Pope
 Michigan - Judith Lamparter
 Mississippi - Sandra Mazur
 Missouri - Mikee Campbell
 Nevada - Janet Hadland
 New Hampshire - Sandra Kay
 New Jersey - Joyce Thompson
 New York - Sherrylyn Patecell
 North Carolina - Brenda Smith
 Ohio - Joan Colucy
 Oregon - Joyce Collin
 Pennsylvania - Margaret Lineman
 Rhode Island - Marilyn Scott
 South Carolina - Judy Clyburn
 Tennessee - Gail White
 Texas - Jackie Williams
 Utah - Patricia Profaizer
 Vermont - Barbara Kearney
 West Virginia - Nickie Gagalis
 Wisconsin - Sherri Mathson

No state delegate: Delaware, Minnesota, Montana, Nebraska, New Mexico, North Dakota, Oklahoma, South Dakota, Virginia, Washington, Wyoming

External links 
 

1962
1962 in Florida
1962 beauty pageants